Muskingum County is a county located in the U.S. state of Ohio. As of the 2020 census, the population was 86,410. Its county seat is Zanesville. Nearly bisected by the Muskingum River, the county name is based on a Delaware American Indian word translated as "town by the river" or "elk's eye".

Muskingum County comprises the Zanesville, OH Micropolitan Statistical Area, which is also included in the Columbus-Marion-Zanesville, OH Combined Statistical Area. The Zanesville Micropolitan Statistical Area is the second-largest statistical area within the Combined Statistical Area, after the Columbus Metropolitan Statistical Area.

Name

The name Muskingum may come from the Shawnee word mshkikwam 'swampy ground'. The name may also be from Lenape "Machkigen," referring to thorns, or a specific species of thorn bush. Muskingum has also been taken to mean 'elk's eye' (mus wəshkinkw) by folk etymology, as in mus 'elk'  + wəshkinkw 'its eye'. Moravian missionary David Zeisberger wrote that the Muskingum River was called Elk's Eye "because of the numbers of elk that formerly fed on its banks."

Geography

It is the fourth-largest county in Ohio by land area.

Adjacent counties
 Coshocton County (north)
 Guernsey County (east)
 Noble County (southeast)
 Morgan County (south)
 Perry County (southwest)
 Licking County (west)

Demographics

2000 census
As of the census of 2000, there were 84,585 people, 32,518 households, and 22,860 families living in the county. The population density was 127 people per square mile (49/km2). There were 35,163 housing units at an average density of 53 per square mile (20/km2). The racial makeup of the county was 93.91% White, 4.01% Black or African American, 0.21% Native American, 0.27% Asian, 0.02% Pacific Islander, 0.20% from other races, and 1.37% from two or more races. 0.52% of the population were Hispanic or Latino of any race.

There were 32,518 households, out of which 33.30% had children under the age of 18 living with them, 54.30% were married couples living together, 12.00% had a female householder with no husband present, and 29.70% were non-families. 24.90% of all households were made up of individuals, and 10.90% had someone living alone who was 65 years of age or older. The average household size was 2.53 and the average family size was 3.01.

In the county, the population was spread out, with 25.90% under the age of 18, 9.40% from 18 to 24, 27.70% from 25 to 44, 22.60% from 45 to 64, and 14.30% who were 65 years of age or older. The median age was 36 years. For every 100 females, there were 92.00 males. For every 100 females age 18 and over, there were 88.40 males.

The median income for a household in the county was $35,185, and the median income for a family was $41,938. Males had a median income of $31,537 versus $22,151 for females. The per capita income for the county was $17,533. About 9.90% of families and 12.90% of the population were below the poverty line, including 17.90% of those under age 18 and 10.00% of those age 65 or over.

2010 census
As of the 2010 United States Census, there were 86,074 people, 34,271 households, and 23,125 families living in the county. The racial makeup of the county was 93.0% white, 3.8% black or African American, 0.3% Asian, 0.2% American Indian, 0.2% from other races, and 2.5% from two or more races. Those of Hispanic or Latino origin made up 0.8% of the population. In terms of ancestry, 25.2% were German, 15.5% were Irish, 11.1% were American, and 10.9% were English.

Of the 34,271 households, 32.3% had children under the age of 18 living with them, 49.1% were married couples living together, 13.2% had a female householder with no husband present, 32.5% were non-families, and 26.9% of all households were made up of individuals. The average household size was 2.46 and the average family size was 2.95. The median age was 39.5 years.

The median income for a household in the county was $39,538 and the median income for a family was $48,425. Males had a median income of $40,183 versus $28,668 for females. The per capita income for the county was $20,561. About 13.0% of families and 16.6% of the population were below the poverty line, including 24.6% of those under age 18 and 9.3% of those age 65 or over.

Education 
The county is served by 7 high schools: John Glenn High School in New Concord (East Muskingum Local School District), Philo High School confusingly not located in Philo but instead across the river in Duncan Falls (Franklin Local School District), Maysville High School located in South Zanesville (Maysville Local Schools), Bishop Rosecrans (Catholic high school in downtown Zanesville), Tri-Valley High School located in Dresden (Tri-Valley Local School District), West Muskingum High School located in Zanesville (West Muskingum Local School District), and Zanesville High School which, as the name implies, is in Zanesville (Zanesville City School District).

Each high school is the only high school in school districts of the same name, the exception being Roscrans as the district is referred to as Bishop Fenwick.

The county is also served by three colleges, Muskingum University, Zane State College, and a branch campus of Ohio University known as Ohio University Zanesville.

Politics
Muskingum County is a Republican stronghold county in presidential elections. The 1964 election is the most recent in which the county voted Democratic, but Bill Clinton came within 48 votes of carrying it in 1996.

|}

Culture
The Ohio Anti-Slavery Society was originally created as an auxiliary of the American Anti-Slavery Society and held its first meeting Putnam, Ohio, in April 1835. 
In 1872, Zanesville annexed the town of Putnam. It is now the Putnam Historic District of Zanesville.

The Muskingum County Library System serves the communities of Muskingum County from its administrative offices in Zanesville, Ohio.  This includes service to Dresden, Duncan Falls, New Concord, and Roseville. In 2005, the library loaned more than 918,000 items to its 73,000 cardholders. Total holding are over 328,000 volumes with over 190 periodical subscriptions.

The Wilds is a  wildlife preserve open to visitation for a fee.

Communities

City
 Zanesville (county seat)

Villages

 Adamsville
 Dresden
 Frazeysburg
 Fultonham
 Gratiot
 New Concord
 Norwich
 Philo
 Roseville
 South Zanesville

Townships

 Adams
 Blue Rock
 Brush Creek
 Cass
 Clay
 Falls
 Harrison
 Highland
 Hopewell
 Jackson
 Jefferson
 Licking
 Madison
 Meigs
 Monroe
 Muskingum
 Newton
 Perry
 Rich Hill
 Salem
 Salt Creek
 Springfield
 Union
 Washington
 Wayne

https://web.archive.org/web/20160715023447/http://www.ohiotownships.org/township-websites

Census-designated places
 Duncan Falls
 East Fultonham
 North Zanesville
 Pleasant Grove
 Trinway

Other unincorporated communities

 Adams Mills
 Bloomfield
 Blue Rock
 Bridgeville
 Chandlersville
 Coal Hill
 Dillon Falls
 Duncan Falls
 Ellis
 Freeland
 Gaysport
 Gilbert
 High Hill
 Hopewell
 Irville
 Licking View
 Mattingly Settlement
 Meadow Farm
 Mount Sterling
 Museville
 Nashport
 Otsego
 Rix Mills
 Ruraldale
 Sonora
 Stovertown
 Sundale
 White Cottage
 Young Hickory
 Zeno

Historical places
 Irville - Former populated place in Licking Township, removed for the creation of Dillon Lake.
 Mattingly Settlement - Named for the many members of the Mattingly family who settled in Muskingum Township.

See also
 National Register of Historic Places listings in Muskingum County, Ohio

References

Further reading
 
 Thomas, William Lewis. (1928). History of Southeastern Ohio and the Muskingum Valley, 1788-1928. In Three Volumes. Chicago: S.J. Clarke Publishing Co.

External links

 Muskingum County Library System website
 Muskingum County Sheriff's Office

 
1804 establishments in Ohio
Appalachian Ohio
Counties of Appalachia
Populated places established in 1804